Kalevi Kärkinen (15 August 1934 – 8 April 2004) was a Finnish ski jumper who competed in the early 1960s. He won the event in Innsbruck during the 1960–61 Four Hills Tournament His younger brother Juhani was also an international ski jumper.

References

1934 births
2004 deaths
Sportspeople from Helsinki
Finnish male ski jumpers